Raorchestes glandulosus, also known as glandular bush frog, rough-skinned bush frog, southern bubble-nest frog, and with many other names, is a species of frog in the family Rhacophoridae. It is endemic to the Western Ghats, India, and known from the states of Karnataka and Kerala.

Description
The distinguishing feature of this species, at least among the Raorchestes from the Western Ghats, is its yellow dorsal surface of the forearm and the loreal region. Raorchestes glandulosus are small frogs. Among the generally small Raorchestes, this makes them medium-sized. The snout is pointed. The dorsum is shagreened. The lateral abdominal area is prominently glandular (hence the specific name glandulosus). Dorsal coloration varies between individuals and environmental conditions between dark green to dark purple or violet. The sides, forelimbs, and the loreal and tympanic regions are yellow. The ventrum is yellow to light yellow.

Habitat
Raorchestes glandulosus is an arboreal species, usually found higher that 4 metres above the ground. It can be found within rainforest but also disturbed habitats such as forest fringes near coffee plantations and gardens. Raorchestes glandulosus is threatened by habitat loss.

References

External links
 

glandulosus
Frogs of India
Endemic fauna of the Western Ghats
Amphibians described in 1854
Taxa named by Thomas C. Jerdon
Taxonomy articles created by Polbot